The Judge may refer to:

Books and drama
The Judge, 1925 US translation of The Old Man (Gorky play), 1915

People
 Milt Hinton (1910–2000), American jazz bassist nicknamed "The Judge"
 Andrew Napolitano, former New Jersey Superior Court judge and now host of the television show Freedom Watch
 Aaron Judge, nickname for American baseball player
Judge Holden, probably fictional character

Film and TV

Film
 The Judge (1949 film), a 1949 American film
 The Judge (1960 film), a 1960 Swedish film
 The Judge (1984 film), a 1984 French crime drama film
 The Judge (2014 film), a 2014 American film
 The Judge, a 2017 documentary film directed by Erika Cohn

TV
 The Judge (TV series), a syndicated television drama that ran from 1986–1993
 "The Judge" (Millennium), a 1996 season one episode of Millennium
 "The Judge" (The Blacklist), a 2014 episode of TV series The Blacklist

Music
 "The Judge"  (song), a song by Twenty One Pilots from their album Blurryface
 "The Judge", a song by Soul Asylum from their 1986 album While You Were Out

Miscellaneous
 Judge (magazine), a late 19th-century United States publication
 Taurus Judge, a revolver produced by Taurus International
 "The Judge", a variant of the Pontiac GTO sports car from 1969 to 1971

The Judges
The Judges may refer to:
 Book of Judges, one of the books of the Old Testament of the Bible
 Biblical judges, the translated name commonly given to the chief magistrates of the Hebrews
 Brandeis Judges, the varsity athletics teams at Brandeis University
 The Judges (demogroup), a Commodore 64 demogroup
 The Judges, a novel by Elie Wiesel

See also
 Judge
 Judge (disambiguation)